Plaza Huincul is a small city in Neuquen province, with a population of around 13,000 people, located in southwestern Argentina. Plaza Huincul is located in the middle of the desert and grew due to an oil discovery in the area in 1918. It is said that the largest fossils in the world are found there; for example, the Argentinosaurs.

Plaza Huincul has an oil & gas refinery that belongs to YPF, an Argentinian oil company and it shares various common factors with the city of Cutral Có (mostly with its paleontological tourism). One of the most important roads in the province go through Plaza Huincul: National Road Number 22.

Its economy is mainly around oil & gas services. There is a growing number of farms that raise sheep and goats

History
The area around what is Plaza Huincul today was first seen in 1876 during the "Desert Campaign". In 1876, a Chilean man by the surname of Campos and his wife Carmen Funes (known as "Pastoverde", translating into green grass) are said to be the ones who first settled into Plaza Huincul and welcomed travelers in case they needed a break; for example, the Pehuenches and Mapuches tribes. They later permanently lived in Plaza Huincul. Plaza Huincul stands for Plaza of the hills.

The town grew rapidly when on 13 September 1918, YPF took employees to Plaza Huincul to work on the first oil rig for YPF (Yacimientos Petroliferos Fiscales). Plaza Huincul then inaugurated a train station on 20 November 1921. A reminder of this is still in place today as a big arch showing the entrance to YPF camp.

On 1 February 1967 Plaza Huincul became a Municipality (city).

Paleontology 
The municipality gave its name to the Huincul Formation, a fossiliferous stratigraphic unit dating back to the Cenomanian stage of the Late Cretaceous. Argentinosaurus, the largest dinosaur found thus far, was discovered in Plaza Huincul by Guillermo Heredia. The Argentinosaurus was discovered in 1987 by a rancher who mistook the legbone of the dinosaur for petrified wood.

Geography

Topography 
Plaza Huincul is in Neuquen province, which is in the western area of Argentina. Plaza Huincul lies upon the coordinates of: 38°55′00″S and 69°09′00″W. Plaza Huincul has an estimated area of 30,000 km2 and lies in a relatively flat and low-lying area. The city has been built along the Roads number 17 (Province) and number 22 (National). Road 17 connects Plaza Huincul with Osorno, Chile and even Bariloche. Plaza Huincul is situated around 161 km from international border between Argentina and Chile.

Climate
Plaza Huincul features a desert climate. Temperatures vary throughout the year with an average of 13.1 °C. The hottest month is January with an average of 29 degrees Celsius, where the coldest month is July with an average of 0 degrees Celsius. Plaza Huincul sees low precipitation  with an overall value of 157mm per year and around 13mm every month.

References

Populated places in Neuquén Province